North Central Province may refer to:
North Central Province, Maldives
North Central Province, Sri Lanka
North Central Province (Victoria), former electorate of the Victorian Legislative Council (Australia), abolished in 1908

See also
North Central (disambiguation)

Province name disambiguation pages